Donacaula sordidellus is a moth in the family Crambidae. It was described by Johann Leopold Theodor Friedrich Zincken in 1821. It is found in North America, where it has been recorded from Florida, Louisiana, Mississippi, Nebraska, New Jersey, New York, North Carolina, North Dakota, South Carolina and Texas.

Adults have been recorded on wing year round in the southern part of the range.

References

Moths described in 1821
Schoenobiinae